Berliner Lake is a lake in Carver County, Minnesota, United States.

Berliner Lake was named after Berlin, the former home of an early German settler.

References

Lakes of Minnesota
Lakes of Carver County, Minnesota